Loki is the god of mischief in Norse mythology.

Loki may also refer to:

Computing
 LOKI, a family of cryptographic block ciphers
 Loki (C++), a C++ software library
 Loki (computer), a proposed home computer
 Loki Software, a software firm

Fictional characters
 Loki (Marvel Comics), a character in Marvel Comics
 Loki (Marvel Cinematic Universe), the character adapted for the media franchise, since 2011
 Loki (TV series), a 2021 Marvel series
 Loki (Dark Horse Comics), a character in The Mask comic book series and related media
 Loki (Dogma), a character in the film Dogma
 Loki (Stargate), a character in the TV series Stargate SG-1
 A character in the novel series Daemon
 A character in the light novel series Is It Wrong to Try to Pick Up Girls in a Dungeon? and its derived works
 A character in the TV series Space Academy
 A character in the TV series Total Drama Presents: The Ridonculous Race
 A character in the anime Saint Seiya: Soul of Gold
 A character in the video game Age of Mythology
 A character in the video game God of War
 A character in the video game Fire Emblem Heroes
 A character in the video game Bayonetta 2
 A character in the video game Ghosts 'n Goblins
 A character in the video game Vigilante 8

People
 Loki (rapper), stage name of Darren McGarvey
 A pseudonym of British mathematician and biostatistician Karl Pearson
 Loki Schmidt, the wife of German ex-Chancellor Helmut Schmidt

Other uses
 Loki, Indonesia. a village on Seram Island
 Loki? (album), a 1974 album by Arnaldo Baptista
 Loki (video game), a 2007 video game
 "Loki", a 2012 song by Icelandic Viking metal band Skálmöld from the album Börn Loka
 Loki (rocket), an American sounding rocket, later developed into the Super Loki rocket
 Loki, an isopod genus in the family Bopyridae
 Loki Patera, a volcano on Jupiter's moon Io
 Lokichogio (also called Loki), a town in northern Kenya
 Debreceni VSC, an association football club nicknamed Loki
 LoKI, a SANS (small angle neutron scattering) beamline at the European Spallation Source

See also
 Loki7, the alias of Roger Charles Bell, a pipe-bomber and former educator from Prince Edward Island, Canada
 Loki's Castle, a field of hydrothermal vents
 Lokiarchaeota,  a proposed phylum of Archaea named after Loki's Castle
 Loci, the plural of locus
 Low Ki or Brandon Silvestry a professional wrestler
 The Mythical Detective Loki Ragnarok
 Lokai, a half-white, half-black character in "Let That Be Your Last Battlefield", an episode of Star Trek